The Suzuki G70 (formerly Suzuki Regina) is a subcompact hatchback concept revealed by Japanese automobile manufacturer Suzuki at the 2011 Tokyo Motor Show.

Overview
The Suzuki G70 concept was initially revealed at the Tokyo Motor Show on December 2, 2011 in Tokyo, Japan as the Suzuki Regina, alongside the second-generation Suzuki Swift Sport, the Swift EV Hybrid concept, and the Q Concept, as the automaker's idea of an fuel-efficient global small car. The Regina was later shown at the Geneva Motor Show the following year on March 8, 2012 in Geneva, Switzerland as the G70. The name was initially used during development of the concept.

Specifications

Technical specifications
The Suzuki G70 concept uses a 800cc turbocharged internal combustion engine with a start-stop system and a CVT automatic transmission, and is in the front-engine, front-wheel drive layout. Also featured in the G70 concept is regenerative braking.

Exterior
The exterior of the Suzuki G70 is somewhat resemblant of the Citroën DS, as described by Car and Driver, for its overall shape and semi-covered rear wheels. The concept is painted in a bright green with a white roof, and features white rims with green accents.

Interior
The interior of the Suzuki G70 concept continues the exterior color scheme of green, white, and black, and features a large front center touchscreen.

References

Concept cars
Suzuki concept vehicles
Hatchbacks